Gonzalo Carreras (born 26 October 1989) is an Argentinean sprint canoeist who won two medals at the 2015 Pan American games. His four-man team placed 12th in the K-4 1000 m event at the 2016 Summer Olympics.

References

1989 births
Living people
Argentine male canoeists
Canoeists at the 2016 Summer Olympics
Olympic canoeists of Argentina
Pan American Games medalists in canoeing
Pan American Games silver medalists for Argentina
Pan American Games bronze medalists for Argentina
Canoeists at the 2015 Pan American Games
Medalists at the 2015 Pan American Games
21st-century Argentine people